When I Look At You is a single by Miley Cyrus.

When I Look At You may also refer to these songs:

"When I Look At You", a single by Anita Harris
"When I Look At You", by Grover Washington, Jr.
"When I Look At You", by The Jacksons
"When I Look At You", from the musical The Scarlet Pimpernel (musical)
"It Only Happens (When I Look at You)" by Aretha Franklin from album Stakes Is High
"When I Look At You", song by Roads End (band)
"When I Look At You", song by Dean Randolph
"When I Look At You", song by The Encores